The attempt to create a Kingdom of Finland in 1742 is a little-known chapter in the history of Finland. After the Russian occupation during the Russo-Swedish War (1741–1743) and vague promises of making Finland independent, Finns elected the Duke Peter of Holstein-Gottorp, who later became heir to the throne of Russia and Emperor as Peter III, as the King of Finland. However, the political situation had outgrown the idea of Finnish independence, which quickly evaporated.

Background

Duke Charles Peter of Holstein-Gottorp was the closest living relative (grand-nephew) and the natural heir of the recently deceased, childless Queen Ulrika Eleonora (died 1741),  and similarly the grand-nephew of the childless King Charles XII of Sweden, Ulrika Eleonora's only brother and predecessor on the throne. Even though he was just a 14-year-old Scandinavian German who had never even been to Sweden, he was very popular among the peasantry, in Finland especially for the fact that he was also the nephew of Empress Elizabeth of Russia and could thus ensure a more enduring peace.

It has been described of Charles Peter of Gottorp that he identified himself with his Swedish heritage and that even afterwards, living in St. Petersburg, would have liked to make his own environment and lands to resemble Scandinavia. In the imperial court of St. Petersburg, he grew up in a specifically "Holsteinian" separate sub-culture.

When the Russian counter-offensive started in March 1742, Chancellor Bestuzhev probably toyed with the idea of making a buffer state in between Sweden and Russia. Empress Elizabeth presented Finns — then still a part of the Kingdom of Sweden — with a declaration (Manifest of Empress Elisabeth to Finnish People) wherein she promised to make Finland independent if they did not resist her troops.

By July 1742, Russia had occupied all of Finland, meeting almost no resistance at all due to ineffective Swedish military command and forces, and that month a group of Finnish peasants pleaded with the Russians to make the duke the King of Sweden.

Diet Lantdag of Turku

General James Keith, a Scottish mercenary responsible for the occupying Russian forces in the south, called for the estates of southwestern Finland — roughly today's Southwest Finland and Satakunta — to meet at lantdag (Diet of Finland) in Turku (Åbo) on 8 (or 18) October 1742. Each city and hundred was to send one from nobility and two from clergy, bourgeoisie and peasants to discuss matters important for the "cities and the whole country".

Known representatives that showed up in the city were e.g. freiherrs i.e. barons Henrik Rehbinder and Johannes Gripenberg, vicars pastors from Loimaa, Halikko, Pöytyä and Maaria and mayors of Rauma and Pori. Names of peasants have not survived, but they were probably best represented. On the official agenda presented by Keith were mostly daily proceedings, but Russians also assured to nominate only local officials and improve usage of the Finnish language in the domestic administration. Encouraged by Russians' earlier promises of independence, friendly occupation and their own apparent willingness to seize the moment, Finns presented the general with the decision to ask Duke Peter of Holstein-Gottorp to be the King of Finland. It is not known how the lantdag reached that decision as no official records of the meeting have survived, but from Russians' internal correspondence it seems evident that it was on the Finns' initiative. Preparations to form a delegation to present the Empress with the request started.

According to Sjöström (pp 540–541) Keith summoned the Diet of Finland to convene in October 1742 at Turku, Finland. This Diet soon proclaimed duke Kaarle Petteri Ulrik as King of Finland.

At the same time, the riksdag of Sweden had gathered in Stockholm, trying to find a way out of the military and political situation generated by the Hats' hasty and ill-advised war. As King Frederick I was without an heir apparent, the Swedish estates decided to use the future crown in negotiations, also selecting the same Duke as the next King of Sweden.

Events were however developing at a fast pace. Russian troops had taken over Finland with much ease, and Elizabeth decided to make Duke Charles Peter her own heir to the Imperial throne, as she was without an heir apparent herself. The Swedish parliament was unaware of this, and when their envoy arrived in Saint Petersburg, it was too late. The underage Charles Peter's succession rights to Sweden were renounced on his behalf.

New negotiations were thus opened, and Elizabeth agreed to restore the greater part of Finland if her cousin, Adolph Frederick of Holstein, was elected successor to the Swedish crown, thus concluding the war by the Treaty of Åbo Turku on 7 August 1743.

According to Sjöström (pp 540–541) the Swedes managed to repossess much of Finland in the Treaty of Turku. Elisabeth and Kaarle Petteri Ulrik kept the Finnish lands east of the River Kymi. Those lands were later known as “Old Finland”.

Long unaware of the procedures elsewhere, the Finnish delegation was still only preparing for its trip to Saint Petersburg, when the word of Elizabeth's new mood reached them. Russians effectively stopped the process there, and the Diet lantdag representatives left for their homes. Most probably the duke never got to know about his election to the ephemeral throne of Finland.

In late 1742, general Keith was succeeded in the leadership of civil administration of Finland (based at Turku) by the new Governor-General, Johannes Balthasar von Campenhausen.

Aftermath

Disappointment in the results of the Turku Diet lantdag generated some plans to rebel against the Russian occupation, but no actions came of these sentiments.

In general, the events of the Turku Diet lantdag in 1742 had no consequences after the Russian occupation ended the following year. Elizabeth's new candidate was elected as the next King of Sweden, and some Finnish territory was ceded to Russia. However, the events clearly resemble what happened seventy years later in the Finnish War, which ended up with the Finnish estates gathering in the Diet of Porvoo and swearing their oaths of loyalty to the Russian Emperor Alexander I as the Grand Duke of Finland. Alexander was the grandson of the Duke Charles Peter.

Sjöström (pp 540–541) mentions that those lands of “Old Finland” were in a sense the surviving continuation of the Kingdom of Finland from 1742.

Häkkinen and Sippu (pages 84–85) mention that still in the 1790s, certain farmers of the villages of Liikkala, Mämmälä and Ruotila in Old Finland, lodged a claim in court where they pleaded certain provisions of the 1742 Manifest of Empress Elisabeth among other points of law to support their position in that lawsuit. This implies that the 1742 manifest and the "statehood" of the ephemeral 1742 kingdom were still regarded as part of the fundamental rights in the Russian-held Old Finland.

According to biographical account collected by Dr. Paaskoski (pages 101–102), Johannes Balthasar von Campenhausen (1689-1758) was between 1742 and 1744 the Governor-General of (the occupied) Finland and as successor of James Keith, held the position of leader of civil administration of Finland, firstly at Turku. As consequence of the Treaty of Turku of 1743, Governor-General Johannes Balthasar von Campenhausen transferred his seat to Lappeenranta, in the Old Finland. By the year 1744, Governor-General von Campenhausen organized the administration of Old Finland under himself. Swedish law and administrative practices were employed in the administration organized by von Campenhausen.

According to Sjöström (pp 540–541), from 1743 to 1917, Old Finland (and other territories with which it merged), was governed as a separate territory with its own administration, law system, governance and constitution, in many aspects similar to the principalities of Germany. The hereditary monarchical ruler of these territories was always a member of the family of the dukes of Gottorp.

The sovereigns apparently displayed their claim to the Kingdom in a heraldic way: Since 1788, the Arms of Old Finland (Governorate of Finland) included the royal crown under "the protection of" the imperial crown.

See also
 Walhalla-orden
 Monarchy of Finland
 Anjala conspiracy
 Kingdom of Finland (1918)

References

 Sjöström (2011), "Y-DNA and records of medieval land inheritance in Rolandh and Tepponen lineages of Vehkalahti, Finland", Journal of the Foundation for Medieval Genealogy, volume 3 issue 6 (July 2011) pages 527..563
 Veli Häkkinen and Seppo Sippu (2000), "Mämmälän kylän talot ja suvut", Vammala 2000.
 Jyrki Paaskoski (2003), biography of baron Johannes Balthasar von Campenhausen (1689-1758), entry in Suomen Kansallisbiografia, part 2 (National Encyclopedia of Biography of Finland), 2003, pages 101–102.

Finnish monarchy
Wars involving Russia
Wars involving Sweden
Finland (1742)
1742 in Finland
Finland (1742)
Finland (1742)
1742 establishments in Europe
Finland (1742)
Finland (1742)
Peter III of Russia